Kerri French is an American poet.

Life
Originally from North Carolina, she received a Bachelor of Arts degree from the University of North Carolina at Chapel Hill.  She graduated from the University of North Carolina, Greensboro's Master of Fine Arts program in 2006.  She has taught at Boston University and Mount Ida College.  Her latest project, for DIAGRAM magazine, is a series of poems focused on British singer Amy Winehouse.

Her work appears in Agenda, Brooklyn Review, Fugue, Lumina, The Blotter, DIAGRAM, Natural Bridge, and foursquare editions. She has broadcast her poems on Sirius Satellite Radio.

She currently resides in Tennessee.

Awards
2009 Larry Franklin and Mei Kwong Fellowship (Writers' Room of Boston)

Works
"ONE MONTH AFTER CAMDEN TOWN FIRE, AMY WINEHOUSE DIAGNOSED WITH SKIN CONDITION"; "DOCTORS WARN AMY WINEHOUSE OF FUTURE EMPHYSEMA RISK", Diagram 8.6

Anthologies

Anthology, July 19, 2006

References

External links
"Inspired by Winehouse", BU Today, Caleb Daniloff
 Kerri French

University of North Carolina at Greensboro alumni
Boston University faculty
Year of birth missing (living people)
Living people
American women poets
American women academics
21st-century American women
Mount Ida College faculty